USS LST-1062 was an  in the United States Navy. Like many of her class, she was not named and is properly referred to by her hull designation.

Construction
She was laid down on 30 December 1944, at Hingham, Massachusetts, by the Bethlehem-Hingham Shipyard; launched on 6 February 1945; and commissioned on 5 March 1945.

Service history
Following World War II, LST-1062 performed occupation duty in the Far East until early April 1946. She returned to the United States and was decommissioned on 27 June 1946, and struck from the Navy list on 31 July, that same year. On 25 November 1947, the ship was sold to the Bethlehem Pacific Coast Steel Corp. for scrapping.

Notes

Citations

Bibliography 

Online resources

External links
 

 

LST-542-class tank landing ships
Ships built in Hingham, Massachusetts
1945 ships
World War II amphibious warfare vessels of the United States